The year 2020 is the 27th year in the history of the K-1, an international kickboxing event. The year started with K-1: K’Festa 3.

List of events

K-1: K’Festa 3

K-1: K’Festa 3 was a kickboxing event held by K-1 on March 22, 2020 at the Saitama Super Arena in Saitama, Japan.

Background
The K’Festa 3 event took place on March 22, 2020 in the Saitama Super Arena. The card was scheduled to have an eight man Super Welterweight tournament, featuring: Hiromi Wajima, Avatar Tor Morsi, Yasuhiro Kido, Minoru Kimura, Kaito, Eder Lopes, Katsuya Jinbo and Milan Pales.

Three title defense took place: Yuta Kubo defended the Welterweight title against Jordann Pikeur, Rukiya Anpo defended the Super Lightweight title against Fukashi, and Sina Karimian defended the Cruiserweight title against Ryo Aitaka.

K-1 World GP 2020 -70kg Japan Tournament bracket

Results

K-1 World GP 2020 in Osaka

K-1 World GP 2020 in Osaka will be a kickboxing event held by K-1 on September 22, 2020 at the Edion Arena in Osaka, Japan.

Background
The card featured one title defense, as Rukiya Anpo defended the Super Lightweight title against Hideaki Yamazaki.

Fight Card

K-1 World GP 2020 in Fukuoka

K-1 World GP 2020 in Fukuoka was a kickboxing event held by K-1 on November 3, 2020 at the Fukuoka International Center in Fukuoka, Japan.

Background
The event had a limited audience, with prices for seats moving from 100,000円 (~$948) to 10,000円 (~$95). It was supposed to feature a title defense, as Leona Pettas should have challenged Takeru Segawa for his Super Featherweight title but Takeru suffered an injury to his left hand.

Fight Card

K-1 World GP 2020 Winter's Crucial Bout

K-1 World GP 2020 Winter's Crucial Bout was a kickboxing event held by K-1 on December 13, 2020 at the Ryōgoku Kokugikan in Tokyo, Japan.

Background
The current Super Welterweight champion Minoru Kimura fought the HEAT Kick Middleweight champion Abiral Ghimire, who was on a five fight winning streak in HEAT. Furthermore, the current Krush 65 kg champion Daizo Sasaki fought Tetsuya Yamato, Fumiya Osawa fought Shuji Kawarada, Yasuto Gunji was expected to fight Yusho Kamemoto, Kouki Sasaki was set to face Rimei Takeshi. Omi Wajima was scheduled to fight Yuhei Fujioka.

Former K-1 Super Featherweight champion Hirotaka Urabe was scheduled to fight Kizaemon Saiga. The fight was contested at Super Featherweight. Former RISE Lightweight and REBELS Super Lightweight champion Fukashi Mizutani was expected to face Hayato Suzuki at Super Lightweight. Hiromi Wajima fought Yuhei Fujioka.

Fight Card

See also
 2020 in Glory 
 2020 in Kunlun Fight
 2020 in ONE Championship
 2020 in Romanian kickboxing
 2020 in Wu Lin Feng

References

External links
Official website

2020 sport-related lists
K-1 events
2020 in kickboxing
2020 in Japanese sport